Hotel Warwick is a historic hotel building located at Newport News, Virginia. It was built in 1928, and is a seven-story, brick building in an eclectic Gothic Revival / Art Deco style. It features terra cotta tile ornamentation and a continuous terra cotta and brick false parapet. A two-story addition was added to the rear of the building in 1962. It was the first skyscraper, first tower hotel and first fireproof hotel in Newport News.  It replaced an earlier Hotel Warwick built by Collis Potter Huntington in 1883.

It was listed on the National Register of Historic Places in 1984.

References

Hotel buildings on the National Register of Historic Places in Virginia
Hotel buildings completed in 1928
Gothic Revival architecture in Virginia
Art Deco architecture in Virginia
Buildings and structures in Newport News, Virginia
National Register of Historic Places in Newport News, Virginia
1928 establishments in Virginia